Edward Smith (1839–1919) was an English biographer. A Fellow of the Statistical Society, Smith was awarded its Howard Medal in 1875, for an essay on "The State of the Dwellings of the Poor [...]", then published as The Peasant's Home.

Works
The Peasant's Home, 1760-1875 (1876)
William Cobbett: A Biography (1878)
The Story of the English Jacobins (1881)
Foreign Visitors in England (1889)
England and America after Independence (1900)
The Life of Sir Joseph Banks (1911)

Contributions to the DNB
 John Almon
 Thomas Amyot
 Edward Baines
 Samuel Bamford
 William Pleydell-Bouverie
 Hugh Boyd (1746-1794)
 Francis Burdett
 Mathew Carey
 John Cartwright (1740-1824)
 William Cobbett

References

External links
 

1839 births
1919 deaths
English biographers